Pseudosphromenus cupanus, also known as the spiketail paradisefish is a species of medium-small gouramies native to southern India and Sri Lanka. This species is often found in shallow, slow-moving or stagnant water, such as ditches and paddy fields. P. cupanus eats insects and zooplankton. Males are known to gather eggs in its mouth, and to guard the nest after eggs are hatched. The male may build many nests, and periodically move the eggs between them.

References

cupanus
Freshwater fish of Sri Lanka
Taxa named by Georges Cuvier
Fish described in 1831